Tan (1046–684 BCE) was an ancient state located in present-day Shandong Province, China. It is the first state reported to be "extinguished"  during the Spring and Autumn period.

Foundation
In 1046 BCE, Zhou, the last king of the Shang Dynasty, was defeated at the Battle of Muye by King Wu, founder of the Zhou Dynasty. Following this victory, he founded a number of small subordinate vassal states  to be ruled by his brothers and generals. One of these was the State of Tan, which was located just east of present-day Jinan, the capital of the present-day Shandong Province. The Tan rulers, who were reputed to be descendants of Yu the Great (the legendary ancient king and founder of the Xia Dynasty), were given the then-new heredity title of zijue (tzu-chueh - 子爵) or viscount.

Demise
In February 684 BCE, when rulers of neighboring states went to congratulate Duke Huan of Qi, ruler of the neighboring State of Qi, on defeating the State of Lu and the State of Song, Xian Li, the ruler of Tan declined to go.

Later in October of that year, the ruler of Qi used this discourtesy as an excuse to attack Xian Li and his three brothers. After ten days, his siege was successful, and Xian Li fled with 200 members of the royal court to the State of Ju, where his son, Qi Yi, was the ruler. Qi Yi was the first to change his clan name to Tan in memory of their defeated state.

Today, Tancheng claims to be the ancient capital of this State of Tan. However, it has also been argued that it is actually the capital of a State of Tan established during the Tang Dynasty. Others argue that the ancient capital is the present-day Mingshui Sub-district of the city of Zhangqiu in Shandong Province.

References

History of Shandong
Ancient Chinese states
States and territories established in the 11th century BC
Zhou dynasty